is a Japanese tokusatsu drama and the 42nd entry of the Toei Company's long-running Super Sentai metaseries, following Uchu Sentai Kyuranger. This series is the first to feature two different teams of heroes-the gentleman thief-themed Lupinrangers and the police-themed Patrangers-who engage in a three-way battle against an alien criminal organization targeting Earth called the Gangler. It is also the first Super Sentai TV series to not have an ending theme like many of TV Asahi's other shows. Lupinranger VS Patranger, which was the last Super Sentai series to air entirely in the Heisei era, premiered on February 11, 2018, and ended on February 10, 2019, joining Kamen Rider Build and later, Kamen Rider Zi-O, in the Super Hero Time line-up on TV Asahi affiliate stations. Additionally, Lupinranger VS Patranger began airing in South Korea in June 2020 as Power Rangers Lupin Force VS Patrol Force.

Story
The Lupin Collection, a vast ensemble of dangerous items acquired by the legendary gentleman thief Arsène Lupin, is stolen by an interdimensional crime syndicate known as the Gangler. However, they receive opposition from two Super Sentai teams: the Lupinrangers: Kairi Yano, Touma Yoimachi and Umika Hayami, who aim to steal back the collection to live up their namesake's reputation and save those they have lost, and the Patrangers: Keiichiro Asaka, Sakuya Hikawa and Tsukasa Myoujin, who are tasked with upholding justice by retrieving the collection and taking down the Gangler. A human drama unfolds that pits the opposing teams against each other as their tale is woven, which is made more intricate by the Lupin Collection's mysterious origins and its contributor Noël Takao, who aids the two teams as their fourth member in the hopes of uniting them against the Gangler for his own agenda. After the Gangler are eventually defeated, the Patrangers learn the Lupinrangers' civilian identities and motives while Noël still works to unite the two Super Sentai teams into one.

Characters

Lupinrangers
The Lupinrangers are a trio of phantom thieves who are recruited by Arsène Lupin's retainer  to save their loved ones, who were taken by the Gangler member, Zamigo Delma, a year prior. The group is based at the  cafe as part-time workers, where they learn the Patrangers' identities while concealing their own until the events of the final battle.

They also each carry a  sidearm, which can be used as either a sword or a reach extender. By setting Good Striker into the VS Changer, a Lupinranger can split into three to perform the  finisher along with their teammates. By setting the Jackpot Striker into the VS Changer, the Lupinrangers can merge into .

Lupin Kaiser can also assume alternate formations by substituting their regular Dial Fighters with auxiliaries.

  
 A 19-year-old impulsive youth who uses the fighter jet-themed  to transform into . He takes his role as a Lupinranger seriously despite lazing around while working at the Bistrot Jurer and his antics with Keiichiro. Behind this façade, Kairi is a traumatized individual who lost his parents as a child, which leads to him becoming jealous of Keiichiro. After apparently losing his older brother, to Zamigo, he seeks vengeance against him and will go berserk at the sight of him.
 By setting the jumbo jet-themed  into the VS Changer, Lupin Red can become the armored , which grants the ability to predict an enemy's maneuvers. He also acquired the  pistol, which is considered to be the Lupin Collection's most powerful item. By combining it with the VS Changer, he can perform the  finisher.

 
 A 24-year-old composed gentleman who uses the war plane-themed  to transform into , having joined the group after the apparent death of his fiancé . As the oldest and most experienced member due to having worked at the  restaurant, he is normally the group's voice of reason, though he is prone to occasional lapses in judgement.

 
Working as a waitress at Bistrot Jurer, she is the most friendly to the Patrangers as she has fought alongside Tsukasa while maintaining her cover.

Patrangers
The group are based at the GSPO's Japan Branch, which is in the same neighborhood as the Bistrot Jurer.

They also each carry a  sidearm, which can be used as either a megaphone or a baton. By setting the Good Striker into the VS Changer, the Patrangers can merge into the tricolored  to perform the  finisher.

Pat Kaiser can also assume alternate formations by substituting their regular Trigger Machines with auxiliaries.

 
 A hot-blooded, serious police officer and leader of the Patrangers who uses  to transform into the red-colored . He puts his duties as a police officer first in pursuing Gangler members and protecting civilians. While he has a positive view on how the Lupin Collection could be used for good, he initially expressed disdain towards the Lupinrangers before learning of Lupin Red's motives and realizing the group is more than they appeared. As Keiichiro grew up with a kind and loving family, he did not know suffering until he met Kairi. After learning of his past and how his brother became one of Zamigo's victims, Keiichiro understands what it means to suffer.
 By setting the tank-themed  into the VS Changer, Patren 1gou can become the armored , which grants a pair of shoulder-mounted cannons.

 
 An optimistic junior to Keiichiro and Tsukasa who uses  to transform into the green-colored . He was brought in to replace Satoru Shinonome, and serves as the team's sharpshooter and police car driver. Sakuya is observant and quick-thinking, though he considers doing his job and protecting civilians as more important than the GSPO's reputation. Unlike Keiichiro, he has a positive view of the Lupinrangers. Sakuya later fell in love with Umika, and denies that she is a Lupinranger until he learned of their identities and learned of Umika's reasoning for becoming a Lupinranger.

 
 A candid, caring policewoman and Keiichiro's classmate from police school who aspired to become an officer like her grandfather and uses  to transform into the pink-colored . As the most calm and collected member of the Patrangers, she is often forced to temper her teammates' personalities. Unlike Keiichiro and Sakuya, she is indifferent towards the Lupinrangers, as she is more focused on their origins and equipment. Despite her serious demeanor, she secretly has an obsession for plush toys and a fondness for adorable children. After learning the Lupinrangers' identities, she developed a desire to help them rather than arrest them.

Noël Takao
 is a mysterious 26-year-old gentleman thief who also operates as a special investigator from the GSPO's French headquarters. He was the adopted son of Arsène Lupin and one of Back World's original inhabitants alongside Kogure, being the one who created the VS Changers and the VS Vehicles along with other items in the Lupin Collection. Noël arrived in Japan to aid the Lupinrangers and Patrangers, intending to unite the two teams against the Gangler.

By setting either the Siren Striker or the Victory Striker into a Lupinranger or Patranger's VS Changer, Noël can become one of two armored forms:  via the Siren Striker, which grants a pair of shoulder-mounted cannons that allow him to perform the  finisher, or  via the Victory Striker, which grants the ability to predict an enemy's maneuvers.

Allies
 
 Nicknamed  by Umika, Good Striker is a sentient puppet from the Lupin Collection who supports the Lupinrangers or the Patrangers depending on his mood as he is compatible with both teams' VS Changers. He can also transform into a large-sized VS Vehicle with Dial Fighter and Trigger Machine modes, forms the core of either team's giant robots, and can combine with the Lupinrangers' primary Dial Fighters, the Patrangers' primary Trigger Machines, and Noël's X Trains to form .

 
 A former Back World resident and butler who worked for Arsène Lupin and assists the Lupinrangers, placing the retrieved Lupin Collection items into a book he carries on his person. While he is primarily focused on regaining the Lupin Collection, Kogure gradually expresses concern for the Lupinrangers while attempting to not become emotionally attached to them. Despite this, he is protective of fellow Back World resident, Noël. After the Patrangers defeated Dogranio, Kogure took the Lupinrangers' loved ones under his wing so they can free them from Dogranio's safe.
 Kogure is portrayed by 

 
 Nicknamed , Jackpot Striker is also a living puppet from the Lupin Collection who first appeared in Kaitou Sentai Lupinranger VS Keisatsu Sentai Patranger en Film to help Kairi and Keiichiro escape after they were trapped in Back World. He later returns in the final episode to help free the Lupinrangers from Dogranio's safe. Like his acquaintance Good Striker, Jackpot Striker can transform into a large-sized VS Vehicle as well as combine with the Lupinrangers' primary Dial Fighters to form .

 
 The head of GSPO's Japan Branch and the Patrangers' direct superior. Hilltop is an easy-going man with a penchant for wagashi who is understanding of his subordinates more than they realize and often watches out for them.

 
 The Patrangers' robotic assistant.

Gangler
The  is a criminal organization composed of prehistoric or extinct animal-themed monsters that was established five centuries ago and reside in Arsène Lupin's mansion, located in a dimension called . When the Ganglers' founding leader, Dogranio Yarbun, decides to retire, he offers to select his heir from whoever among the Gangler membership can take over Earth.

 
 The Ganglers' Tyrannosaurus-themed  founding member and crime lord who led the organization for five centuries armed with the  sword cane. Despite being 999 years old, he is incredibly powerful due to his chest-mounted golden safe, which can hold the entirety of the Lupin Collection and is protected by unbreakable , which he can manipulate for offensive and defensive purposes. After personally killing Arsène Lupin, Dogranio decides to retire and sets up a contest among his subordinates to select the heir to his criminal empire. Following Destra's death, Dogranio confronts the Lupinrangers and Patrangers himself, only to lose all of his Lupin Collection items he held and imprisoned within the GSPO's underground prison, bound with his own chains. In the stage play Kaitou Sentai Lupinranger VS Keisatsu Sentai Patranger: Final Live Tour 2019, which takes place after the final episode, Dogranio escapes with the help of Kazemi and the revived Destra and Gauche, but is destroyed by the Lupinrangers, Patrangers, and Ryusoulgers.

 
 Dogranio's Dilophosaurus-themed right-hand man and bodyguard armed with a war hammer equipped with the built-in  missile pod as well as the ability to summon Golams from his grenades. Destra's shoulder-mounted golden safes originally held two Lupin Collection items: the  slingshot, which increases his firing range, and the  device, which adds a homing effect to his missiles. However, Destra gave them to Gangler members Togeno Aves and Anidara Maximoff for their use. He eventually decides to confront the Super Sentai teams and steals the Siren Striker and Victory Striker, gaining gyrokinesis and foresight respectively, to do so. After the stolen VS Vehicles were retrieved, Destra had Gauche enlarge him, only to be destroyed by the Super Sentai teams. In the stage show Kaitou Sentai Lupinranger VS Keisatsu Sentai Patranger: Final Live Tour 2019, Destra is revived by Kazemi, but is destroyed by the Lupinrangers, Patrangers, and Ryusoulgers.

 
 A tactless and corrupt Oviraptor-themed scientist with  cybernetic arms who supports Gangler members as a doctor to suit her personal agenda. Her built-in back safe contains four items from the Lupin Collection: The  syringe to enlarge Gangler members, the  binoculars to analyze whoever she observes, the  scalpel which turns her right hand into a sharp blade, and the  crest that allowed her to liquefy herself to withstand attacks. After being betrayed by Dogranio, both the Lupinrangers and the Patrangers attacked her, though she was left severely weakened. In a final attempt to kill the teams, she ripped her safe off and attached it to her final experiment, the black Experimental Body, before dying from her wounds. In the stage show Kaitou Sentai Lupinranger VS Keisatsu Sentai Patranger: Final Live Tour 2019, Gauche is revived by Kazemi, but is destroyed by the Lupinrangers, Patrangers, and Ryusoulgers.

 
 A mysterious sea angel-themed marksman and bipolar sociopath who acts on his own whims, is capable of regenerating his body from injuries, and using his  flintlock pistols to transport his victims to another dimension to be used as sacrificial templates for Gangler disguises. Zamigo played a role in the Lupinrangers' formation as they assumed he killed their loved ones during his rampage during Dogranio's 998th birthday, forming a rivalry with Kairi. He later let Gauche implant a third safe on his tail and gains access to her , which allows him to liquefy his body to withstand attacks. After learning that Kairi is the younger brother of one of his victims, Zamigo exploited this to set up a final duel that ended with his death and his victims returned to where he abducted them from. In the stage show Kaitou Sentai Lupinranger VS Keisatsu Sentai Patranger: Final Live Tour 2019, Zamigo is revived by Kazemi, but is destroyed by Lupin Red.

 
 The Gangler's street thug-themed foot soldiers armed with daggers and handguns.

 
 The Modified Podaman are formerly regular Podaman that Gauche gave safes to so they can use Lupin Collection items. One such foot soldier wielded the camera-like , which enables the user to remove their victim's memory and convert it into a photograph based on it, before he was destroyed by Patren 1gou. Another Modified Podaman wielded the fossilized head-like , though the foot soldier was destroyed by Lupin Kaiser Splash Magic before he could use it.

 
 A group of mindless giant alligator snapping turtle-themed foot soldiers with the turtle head-shaped  for hands. They are often summoned by Destra to fight the VS Vehicles.

Gangler Monsters
The  are the monsters that make up the Gangler's ranks who divided the stolen Lupin Collection amongst themselves. To blend into human society, some of the Gangler Monsters wear human disguises purchased from Zamigo. Gauche can also enlarge Gangler monsters with the "Gros caliber".

 : A greedy and inequitable frog-themed Gangler capable of producing  from his organ. He is equipped with the dice-like , which enables the user to manipulate a game's probability. Ruretta posed as a casino owner and abused his Lupin Collection piece to extort money from his patrons before he is destroyed by the Lupinrangers.
 : A sadistic cat-themed Gangler capable of utilizing two extra  arms and firing  from his abdomen. He used the lighter-like , which enables the user to generate and control fire, to rob and burn down a jewelry store. Though he is defeated by the Patrangers, he is enlarged by Gauche and destroyed by Lupin Kaiser.
 : A slug-themed Gangler armed with the left arm-mounted . He used the jade statue-like , which enables the user to remodel any object, to make statues of Dogranio. Though he is defeated by the Lupinrangers, he is enlarged by Gauche and destroyed by Pat Kaiser.
 : A shark-themed Gangler capable of producing  portals from his jaws and is armed with the  spear. He used the gymnastic ribbon-like , which enables the user to change an object's appearance into something cute, to capture people for Gauche so she could use them as guinea pigs for her experiments. Though he is defeated by the Patrangers, he is enlarged by Gauche and destroyed by Lupin Kaiser.
He is equipped with the boot-like , which grants the user superhuman jumping abilities. Bundorute and a group of Podaman targeted Director Hilltop to steal the VS Vehicles. Though he is defeated by Patren 1gou, he is enlarged by Gauche and destroyed by Lupin Kaiser Cyclone.
He used the oil lamp-like , which enables the user to expand any specific space, to expand the ant-headed space on his stomach to consume people. Though he is defeated by the Lupinrangers, he is enlarged by Gauche and destroyed by Pat Kaiser Biker.
 : A deer-themed Gangler armed with the twin  swords. He is equipped with the electric battery-like , which enables the user to generate electricity. Though he is defeated by the Patrangers, he is enlarged by Gauche and destroyed by Lupin Kaiser Knight.
 : A peafowl-themed Gangler armed with the  saber. He is equipped with the tire-like , which enables the user to make their targets slip and fall so long as they are on the ground. Though he is defeated by the Patrangers, Pitch is enlarged by Gauche and destroyed by Lupin Kaiser Hammer Knight.
 : A water flea-themed Gangler capable of producing  bombs. He is equipped with the bracelet-like , which enables the user to run at superhuman speed. Though he is defeated by Lupin Red, Jenko is enlarged by Gauche and destroyed by Pat Kaiser Biker.
 : An otter-themed Gangler armed with the  kusarigama. She is equipped with the scroll-like , which enables the user to generate invisible barriers. Though she is defeated by Lupin Red, Naiyo is enlarged by Gauche and destroyed by Lupin Kaiser Knight.
 : A pair of alpaca-themed Gangler brothers who both wield the  kanabō.
 : The youngest brother who is equipped with Trigger Machine Drill. Though he is defeated by Patren 2gou, he is enlarged by Gauche and destroyed by Trigger Machines Crane and Drill.
 : The eldest brother who is equipped with Trigger Machine Crane. While he was crushed by Pat Kaiser while it was fighting Rabroom Jaws, he was revived so Destra could equip him with the "Le coup de chance", which increases the user's accuracy and adds a homing effect to their projectiles. He is later enlarged by Gauche and destroyed by Lupin Kaiser Cyclone Knight.
 : A sea urchin-themed Gangler sniper capable of producing  and is armed with the  sniper rifle. He is equipped with the shuriken-like , which enables the user to alter the size and/or scale of their body, and the "Au loin", which increases the user's projectiles' range. Togeno was Odordo's accomplice in his raid on GSPO headquarters. Though he is defeated by the Patrangers, he is enlarged by Gauche and destroyed by Pat Kaiser Strong.
 : A manta ray-themed Gangler equipped with the ball-like , which enables the user to shoot explosive fireballs. Though he is defeated by the Lupinrangers, he is enlarged by Gauche and destroyed by Lupin Kaiser Cyclone Knight.
 : A tapir-themed Gangler armed with the  staff. He used the sword-like , which enables the user to use light to extend their body parts, on his shoulder to give it whip-like capabilities. Though he is defeated by the Patrangers, Nero is enlarged by Gauche and destroyed by Pat Kaiser Strong.
He is equipped with the hand fan-like , which enables the user to generate slicing gusts of wind. Though he is defeated by the Patrangers, Sudaru is enlarged by Gauche and destroyed by Pat Kaiser Strong Biker.
 : A monkey-themed Status Double Gangler armed with the  staff. He is equipped with the watch-like , which provides particle energy to double the user's offensive attacks, and the lion-shaped censer-like , which enables the user to create clouds that can be ridden on. Though he is defeated by Lupin X, Zaruden is enlarged by Gauche and destroyed by Lupin Kaiser Trains and X Trains Silver and Gold.
 : A hippopotamus-themed Gangler armed with the toothbrush-shaped  staff. He is equipped with the dumbbell-like , which enables the user to transmute their body into a metallic form. Though he is defeated by the Patrangers, Gabatt is enlarged by Gauche and destroyed by Pat Kaiser Trains.
 : A goldfish-themed Gangler armed with the  staff. He is equipped with the water gun-like , which enables the user to absorb moisture in the air and turn it into water jets. Though he is defeated by Lupin Red, Lupin Blue, and Lupin X, Demeran is enlarged by Gauche and destroyed by X Emperor Slash.
 : A squirrel-themed Gangler armed with the  hammer. He is equipped with the mermaid statue-like , which enables the user to produce bubbles. Though he is defeated by the Lupinrangers and Patren X, he is enlarged by Gauche and destroyed by Lupin Kaiser Cyclone Knight and X Emperor Slash.
 : A chicken-themed Gangler equipped with the recorder-like , which enables the user to manipulate humans so long as they speak. Though he is defeated by the Lupinrangers and Lupin X, he is enlarged by Gauche and destroyed by Pat Kaiser Strong Biker. In the stage show Kaitou Sentai Lupinranger VS Keisatsu Sentai Patranger: Final Live Tour 2019, Pyodor is revived by Kazemi.
 : A giant oarfish-themed Gangler who is also armed with the Shumokku Nokogilance spear. He is equipped with the shark fin-shaped , which enables the user to swim through land and walls as if they were water. Though he is defeated by the Lupinrangers and Lupin X, Ryugu is enlarged by Gauche and destroyed by Lupin Kaiser Magic.
 : A skunk-themed Gangler capable of producing an odorous explosive gas. He is equipped with the flower bouquet-like , which enables the user to alter the scent of odorous objects. He is enlarged by Gauche and destroyed by Lupin Kaiser Splash Magic.
 : A common cuckoo-themed Gangler equipped with the police badge-like , which enables the user to hide their true identity and give them an opposite personality. Yoshi was originally a Status Double Gangler before Gauche removed one of his safes for her Experimental Body. He is destroyed by the Patrangers.
 : A mindless, Chimeric guinea pig-themed  Gangler that Gauche created using five safes. Though it is defeated by the Lupinrangers, the Patrangers, and Patren X, the Experimental Body is enlarged by Gauche and destroyed by Good Cool Kaiser VSX.
 After being wounded by the Lupinrangers and Patrangers, Gauche created a black  Experimental Body and completed it using her own safe. It is equipped with four unspecified Lupin Collection pieces, but the second Experimental Body was destroyed by Victory Lupin Kaiser and X Emperor Gunner before it could use them.
 : An age-manipulating barn swallow-themed Gangler armed with the  club. He is equipped with the fan-like , which enables the user to create whirlwinds. Though he is defeated by the Patrangers and Lupin X, Envy is enlarged by Gauche and destroyed by Pat Kaiser Strong Biker and X Emperor Gunner.
 : An oxygen-manipulating wolf-themed Gangler armed with the  handgun. He is equipped with the moai-like , which enables the user to create earthen walls. Kerbero is defeated twice by Lupin Red armed with the Lupin Magnum, once in his normal size and the second time after being enlarged.
 : A reclusive mole-themed Gangler armed with a pair of excavator bucket-like  claws. He is equipped with the inrō-like , which enables the user to create clones with different personalities who must be reassembled after six hours or else they will die. Though he is defeated by Lupin Red, Doryun is enlarged by Gauche and destroyed by Lupin Kaiser armed with the Lupin Magnum.
 : A woodpecker-themed Gangler armed with the  sword. He is equipped with the smartwatch-like , which increases the user's intelligence. Though he is defeated by the Lupinrangers, he is enlarged by Gauche and destroyed by the Lupin Magnum.
 : A hermit crab-themed Gangler equipped with the clawed gauntlet , which enables the user to create portals for directing attacks. Though he is defeated by Patren 1gou, he is enlarged by Gauche and destroyed by Good Cool Kaiser VSX.
 : A snake-themed Gangler armed with the  arms. He is equipped with the steering wheel-like , which enables the user to control any vehicle or machine of their choosing. Though he is defeated by the Patrangers and Lupin X, he is enlarged by Gauche and destroyed by Siren Lupin Kaiser.
 : A lobster-themed Gangler and Janake's childhood friend armed with the  axe. He is equipped with the pentagon brooch-like , which enables the user to levitate their opponents. Though he is defeated by Super Lupin Red, he is enlarged by Gauche and destroyed by Victory Lupin Kaiser.
He is equipped with the spearhead-shaped , which enables the user to create a fog. Though he is defeated by Super Lupin Red and Super Lupin X, Dugon is enlarged by Gauche and destroyed by Victory Lupin Kaiser.
 : A lizard-themed Gangler armed with the  sword. He was originally equipped with the quill-like , which enables the user to manipulate people like puppets, until Narizma Shibonz took it from him, and Tokagale was equipped with the bomb-like , which enables the user to turn their body into rubber. Though he is defeated by Patren 2gou and Patren 3gou, he is enlarged by Gauche and destroyed by Irregular Victory Lupin Kaiser armed with the Lupin Magnum. In the stage show Kaitou Sentai Lupinranger VS Keisatsu Sentai Patranger: Final Live Tour 2019, Tokagale was revived by Kazemi, but is destroyed by Patren 2gou.
 : A seahorse-themed Status Double Gangler spy armed with the  handgun. He is equipped with the voice-changing microphone-like , which he used to assume Patranger candidate 's identity and gather GSPO intel from their France headquarters for the Gangler before traveling to Japan to use the "Le maître des marionnettes" to discredit Noël. Though he is exposed and defeated by the Patrangers and Super Lupin X, he is enlarged by Gauche and destroyed by Siren Pat Kaiser and X Emperor Gunner.
 : A salmon-themed Gangler armed with the fishing rod-like  sword. He is equipped with the wolf head-shaped paperweight-like , which enhances the user's sense of smell. Though he is defeated by the Lupinrangers and Super Lupin X, Samon is enlarged by Gauche and destroyed by Victory Lupin Kaiser, X Emperor Gunner, and Lupin Magnum Superior. In the stage show Kaitou Sentai Lupinranger VS Keisatsu Sentai Patranger: Final Live Tour 2019, Samon is revived by Kazemi, but is destroyed by Super Patren 3gou.

Laimon Gang
The  is a small, separate faction of Gangler.

 : The lion-themed Status Gold leader and namesake of the Laimon Gang capable of enlarging himself to giant size and utilizing two extra  arms. He is equipped with the blood pressure monitor bracelet-like , which enables the user to instantaneously repair their body from any mortal injury unless they are affected by Zamigo's ice-killing method. After his subordinates' demise, Laimon Gaorfangue challenges the Lupinrangers and Patrangers, forcing the two teams to work together and defeat him with Good Cool Kaiser VSX.
 : Laimon's prideful bull-themed subordinate and personal chef equipped with the ring-like , which enables the user to perform molecular excitation to generate high amounts of heat. Though he is defeated by the Lupinrangers and Lupin X, Ushibarock is enlarged is by Gauche and destroyed by X Emperor Slash.
 : Laimon's kiwi-themed subordinate armed with the  sword. He is equipped with the signal baton-like , which enables the user to successfully evade and deflect all attacks. Though he is defeated by the Patrangers and Patren X, Guiwi is enlarged by Gauche and destroyed by Pat Kaiser and X Emperor Slash.

Other members
 : An unspecified Gangler equipped with the microphone-like , which forces the user to speak in rhyme. Though he is defeated by the Patrangers, Naccio is enlarged by Gauche and destroyed by Pat Kaiser. He appears exclusively in the special drama sessions of the series' first original soundtrack.
 : A penguin-themed Gangler who did not receive a piece from the Lupin Collection. He is destroyed by Lupin Yellow and Patren 3gou. He appears exclusively in the Hyper Battle DVD Kaitou Sentai Lupinranger VS Keisatsu Sentai Patranger: Girlfriends Army.
 : A tanuki-themed Gangler armed with the  handgun. He is equipped with the blade-shaped , which enables the user to create a cherry blossom smokescreen. He is destroyed by Lupin Red and Patren 1gou. He appears exclusively in the web series Kaitou Sentai Lupinranger + Keisatsu Sentai Patranger: The Ultimate Weird Combination!.
 : A chicken-themed Gangler armed with a sword and a sonic screech attack. He uses the megaphone-like , which grants the user a sonic scream, to enhance his own. He is destroyed by the Patrangers. He appears exclusively in the web series Keisatsu Sentai Patranger Feat. Kaitou Sentai Lupinranger: Another Patren 2gou.
 : A fox-themed Gangler armed with the  sword. He is equipped with the Solar System model-like , which enables the user to summon meteors. Herlock assumed a human form to hunt down the Lupinrangers. Though he is defeated alongside Wilson by the Lupinrangers and Patrangers, he is enlarged by Gauche and destroyed by Pat Kaiser. He appears exclusively in the film Kaitou Sentai Lupinranger VS Keisatsu Sentai Patranger en Film.
He is equipped with the magnifying glass-like , which enables the user to bind opponents with vines. Though he is defeated alongside Herlock Sholmès by the Lupinrangers and Patrangers, Wilson is enlarged before being destroyed by Lupin Rex. He appears exclusively in the film Kaitou Sentai Lupinranger VS Keisatsu Sentai Patranger en Film.
 : A kingfisher-themed Gangler who used the clock-like , which enables the user to generate combustible energy spheres and rewind time, to revive several fallen Gangler members before he is destroyed by the five primary Ryusoulgers. First appearing in the final episode of the series, he reappears in the stage show Kaitou Sentai Lupinranger VS Keisatsu Sentai Patranger: Final Live Tour 2019.
 : A pig-themed Gangler armed with the  handgun. He is destroyed by the Lupinrangers, Sasori Orange, Tenbin Gold, Hebitsukai Silver, Chameleon Green, and Kajiki Yellow. He appears exclusively in the film Lupinranger VS Patranger VS Kyuranger.
 : A Chimeric gorilla/white tiger/sea lion/elephant/sturgeon-themed Status Quintuple Gangler armed with the cube-like  spear and the ability to store anything in his safes. Gauche experimented on and imprisoned him in a remote cave, but never got the chance to release him. However, the negative emotions generated from his desire to be freed resulted in the creation of the Griffin Minosaur, which helped fulfill it. Ganima proceeded to capture five of the Ryusoulgers' Kishiryu inside his safes and gains pyrokinesis, geokinesis, hydrokinesis, and cryokinesis; becoming a  Gangler. He is destroyed by the Lupinrangers, Patrangers, and Ryusoulgers. He appears exclusively in the film Kishiryu Sentai Ryusoulger VS Lupinranger VS Patranger the Movie.

Episodes

Production
The Kaitou Sentai Lupinranger VS Keisatsu Sentai Patranger trademark was filed by Toei Company on September 11, 2017.

Films

Kaitou Sentai Lupinranger VS Keisatsu Sentai Patranger - en Film
 was released in Japan on August 4, 2018, double billed with the film for Kamen Rider Build. The events of the movie take place between Kaitou Sentai Lupinranger + Keisatsu Sentai Patranger: The Ultimate Weird Combination! and episode 26 of the series. This is the last Heisei-era Super Sentai movie, released a year before the 2019 Japanese imperial transition.

Ryusoulger VS Lupinranger VS Patranger
The film features a crossover between Lupinranger VS Patranger and Kishiryu Sentai Ryusoulger, and was double-billed with Mashin Sentai Kiramager Episode Zero, the prequel short film for Mashin Sentai Kiramager.

Special episodes
 is Televi-Kuns "Hyper Battle DVD". The event of the special episode takes place between episodes 13 and 14.
 is a web-exclusive series released on Video Pass. It comprises two episodes. The event of the special episode takes place between episode 25 of the series and Kaitou Sentai Lupinranger VS Keisatsu Sentai Patranger - en Film.
 is a web-exclusive series released on Toei Tokusatsu Fan Club. It comprises two episodes. The event of the special episode takes place before episode 27.

V-Cinemas

Lupinranger VS Patranger VS Kyuranger

 is a V-Cinema release that features a crossover between Lupinranger VS Patranger and Uchu Sentai Kyuranger, also including Naoki Kunishima from Doubutsu Sentai Zyuohger reprising his role. The V-Cinema was released on August 21, 2019. The events of the film take place between episodes 46 and 47.

Zenkaiger vs. Kiramager vs. Senpaiger
 is an upcoming V-Cinema release that features a crossover between Kikai Sentai Zenkaiger and Mashin Sentai Kiramager. The V-Cinema is scheduled for a limited theatrical release on April 29, 2022, followed by its DVD and Blu-ray release on September 28, 2022. Additionally, Asahi Ito will make an appearance, reprising his role as Kairi Yano/Lupin Red, alongside Ryota Ozawa of Kaizoku Sentai Gokaiger reprising his role as Captain Marvelous/Gokai Red. The events of the V-Cinema take place after the final episode of Zenkaiger.

Cast
: 
: 
: 
: 
: 
: 
: 
: 
: 
: 
: 
: 
:

Voice actors
: 
: 
: 
: 
: 
: 
Narration:

Guest cast

: 
: 
: 

Opening theme song

Lyrics: 
Composition: 
Arrangement: Hiroshi Takaki (Project.R)
Artist: Project.R

Notes

References

External links
 at TV Asahi
 at Toei Company
 at Super-Sentai.net

Super Sentai
2018 Japanese television series debuts
2019 Japanese television series endings
Japanese crime television series
2010s Western (genre) television series
Television shows based on Arsène Lupin
Neo-Western television series